As of January 2021, there are 2,480,373 South Americans in Spain (all bar 391 being Latin Americans) and 624,034 Central American or Caribbean people in Spain (all bar at most 60,505 being Latin Americans). Flows of migration have been dependent on the economic conditions in their countries of birth and in Spain.

History
Many Latin Americans came to Spain during the country's economic boom in the late 1990s and beginning of the new millennium. The financial crisis that began in 2007 resulted in many leaving: some used acquired Spanish passports to work in northern Europe, while others moved to the United States. Trigger events that served as a push factor from Latin America included the 1998–1999 Ecuador economic crisis and the 1998–2002 Argentine great depression, while Venezuelans are as of 2021 the nationality applying most for asylum in Spain, due to the country's crisis.  Migration fell again in 2020 due to a lack of long-distance flights because of the COVID-19 pandemic.

While ten years is the usual minimum for a foreigner to acquire Spanish nationality by residency, Latin Americans – including Brazilians – can achieve it in two years.

Economics
Nativo, a company set up in 1997 to import Latin American brands to migrants in Spain, was bought in 2008 by Goya Foods, a US-based multinational active across the American continent.

Demographics
As of 2018, 610,871 residents of Madrid were born in Latin America. Migrants from Brazil – the sole Portuguese-speaking country in Latin America – are particularly notable in Galicia, where the native language is close to their own.

By country of birth

Per Instituto Nacional de Estadística, 1 January 2021:

 541,273
 420,733
 415,013
 255,427
 309,425
 186,462
 174,229
 157,667
 145,811
 137,627
 87,685
 83,536
 65,211
 65,463
 63,411
Any other Central American or Caribbean country (including non-Latin American): 60,505

References

Immigration to Spain